TKG can refer to: 
 TKG stands for Tothyo-Kolpo-Golpo, Bengali IT authors' book
 TKG, the IATA code for Radin Inten II International Airport in Bandar Lampung, Indonesia
 Tamago kake gohan, a Japanese breakfast dish of rice and egg
 Telkom (South Africa), a South African telecommunication corporation